Ruengsak Porntawee; also known as Ruengsak Petchyindee (เริงศักดิ์ เพชรยินดี) is a Thai Muay Thai fighter.

Biography and career
Samreeng Manyaing started Muay Thai training at the age of 13 with an aging boxer from his region. He fought under the name "Ruengsak Luklamplaimat" and dominated in Buriram and the neighboring provinces until he was brought to the Porntawee camp.

In 1974 Ruengsak became the 112 lbs champion of both Rajadamnern and Lumpinee stadiums, he earned the nickname "The Stone Man" for his incredible durability and the power of his strikes. During his career Ruengsak defeated notable stadium champions such as Nongkhai Sor.Prapatsorn, Sirimongkol Luksiripat, Narongnoi Kiatbandit, or Padejsuk Pitsanurachan. He also captured the 130 lbs Lumpinee Stadium title in 1981. At the peak of his popularity he received purses of 150,000 baht.

In 1980 Ruengsak quit boxing for a few months before being convinced by Virat Vachirarattanawong to comeback after he bought him as debt clearance from the Porntawee gym owner. Ruengsak then became the first ever Petchyindee gym fighter.

Titles and accomplishments
Lumpinee Stadium
 1974 Lumpinee Stadium 112 lbs Champion
 1981 Lumpinee Stadium 130 lbs Champion (one defense)

Rajadamnern Stadium
 1974 Rajadamnern Stadium 112 lbs Champion

Muay Thai record

|-  style="background:#fbb;"
| 1983-10-10 || Loss ||align=left| Inseenoi Sor.Thanikul || Rajadamnern Stadium || Bangkok, Thailand ||  Decision || 5 || 3:00

|-  style="background:#fbb;"
| 1983- || Loss ||align=left| Samart Prasarnmit || Rajadamnern Stadium || Bangkok, Thailand ||  Decision || 5 || 3:00

|-  style="background:#fbb;"
| 1982-12-24 || Loss ||align=left| Samingnoom Sitiboontham || Rajadamnern Stadium || Bangkok, Thailand ||  Decision || 5 || 3:00

|-  style="background:#;"
| 1982-08-03 || ||align=left| Raktae Muangsurin ||  || Bangkok, Thailand || || ||

|-  style="background:#cfc;"
| 1982- || Win ||align=left| Fanta Attapong ||  || Bangkok, Thailand ||  Decision || 5 || 3:00

|-  style="background:#c5d2ea;"
| 1982-04-02 || No Contest ||align=left| Nongkhai Sor.Prapatsorn|| Lumpinee Stadium || Bangkok, Thailand ||  ||5 || 2:40
|-
! style=background:white colspan=9 |

|-  style="background:#cfc;"
| 1982-02-11 || Win||align=left| Kengkaj Kiatkriangkrai ||  || Bangkok, Thailand || Decision || 5 || 3:00 

|-  style="background:#cfc;"
| 1981- || Win ||align=left| Krongsak Sakkasem || Lumpinee Stadium || Bangkok, Thailand ||  Decision || 5 || 3:00

|-  style="background:#cfc;"
| 1981-11-03 || Win ||align=left| Krongsak Sakkasem || Lumpinee Stadium || Bangkok, Thailand || KO (Punches)||1 || 
|-
! style=background:white colspan=9 |

|-  style="background:#fbb;"
| 1981-07-20 || Loss ||align=left| Kengkaj Kiatkriangkrai || Rajadamnern Stadium || Bangkok, Thailand || Decision || 5 || 3:00 

|-  style="background:#cfc;"
| 1981-10-05 || Win ||align=left| Nakhonsawan Suanmisakawan || Rajadamnern Stadium || Bangkok, Thailand || KO (Punches)|| 3 || 

|-  style="background:#cfc;"
| 1981-01-23 || Win ||align=left| Pornsak Sitchang || Lumpinee Stadium || Bangkok, Thailand || Decision || 5 || 3:00 
|-
! style=background:white colspan=9 |

|-  style="background:#fbb;"
| 1980-08-14 || Loss ||align=left| Nakhonsawan Suanmisakawan || Rajadamnern Stadium || Bangkok, Thailand || Decision || 5 || 3:00 

|-  style="background:#fbb;"
| 1980-01-22 || Loss ||align=left| Tawanlek Sitpoonchai || Lumpinee Stadium || Bangkok, Thailand || Decision || 5 || 3:00 

|-  style="background:#fbb;"
| 1979-11-22 || Loss||align=left| Kengkaj Kiatkriengkrai || || Bangkok, Thailand || Decision || 5||3:00 

|-  style="background:#fbb;"
| 1979-10-11 || Loss ||align=left| Nongkhai Sor.Prapatsorn || Rajadamnern Stadium || Bangkok, Thailand || Decision || 5 || 3:00

|-  style="background:#cfc;"
| 1979-08-23 || Win ||align=left| Kengkaj Kiatkriengkrai || || Bangkok, Thailand || Decision || 5||3:00 

|-  style="background:#cfc;"
| 1979-07-03 || Win ||align=left| Klongyok Kiatsompop || || Bangkok, Thailand || Decision || 5||3:00 

|-  style="background:#cfc;"
| 1979-05-25 || Win ||align=left| Kaopong Sitchuchai || Lumpinee Stadium || Bangkok, Thailand || Decision || 5||3:00 

|-  style="background:#fbb;"
| 1979-03-03 || Loss ||align=left| Khaosod Sitpraprom || Lumpinee Stadium|| Bangkok, Thailand || Decision || 5 || 3:00

|-  style="background:#fbb;"
| 1979-01-17 || Loss ||align=left| Seksan Sor.Thepitak || Rajadamnern Stadium || Bangkok, Thailand || Decision || 5 || 3:00

|-  style="background:#c5d2ea;"
| 1978-12-05 || Draw ||align=left| Khaosod Sitpraprom ||Lumpinee Stadium|| Bangkok, Thailand || Decision || 5 || 3:00

|-  style="background:#fbb;"
| 1978-08-11 || Loss ||align=left| Kaopong Sitchuchai || Lumpinee Stadium || Bangkok, Thailand || Decision || 5|| 3:00  
|-
! style=background:white colspan=9 |

|-  style="background:#cfc;"
| 1978-06-29 || Win ||align=left| Padejsuk Pitsanurachan ||Rajadamnern Stadium|| Bangkok, Thailand || Decision || 5 || 3:00

|-  style="background:#cfc;"
| 1978-05-25 || Win ||align=left| Prawit Sritham || Rajadamnern Stadium|| Bangkok, Thailand || Decision || 5 || 3:00

|-  style="background:#fbb;"
| 1978-04-11 || Loss ||align=left| Seksan Sor.Thepithak ||Lumpinee Stadium|| Bangkok, Thailand || Decision || 5 || 3:00

|-  style="background:#cfc;"
| 1978-02-24 || Win ||align=left| Nueusila Na Bankhod|| Lumpinee Stadium || Bangkok, Thailand || Decision || 5 ||3:00

|-  style="background:#fbb;"
| 1977-12-06 || Loss ||align=left| Wangwon Lukmatulee || Lumpinee Stadium || Bangkok, Thailand || Decision || 5 || 3:00

|-  style="background:#fbb;"
| 1977-07-29 || Loss ||align=left| Jitti Muangkhonkaen || Lumpinee Stadium || Bangkok, Thailand || Decision || 5 || 3:00

|-  style="background:#cfc;"
| 1977-07-06 || Win ||align=left| Narongnoi Kiatbandit ||  || Bangkok, Thailand || Decision || 5 ||3:00

|-  style="background:#cfc;"
| 1977-06-02 || Win ||align=left| Neth Saknarong || Rajadamnern Stadium || Bangkok, Thailand || Decision || 5 ||3:00

|-  style="background:#cfc;"
| 1977-04-28|| Win||align=left| Fakaew Surakorsang || Rajadamnern Stadium || Bangkok, Thailand || KO (Punches)|| 3 || 

|-  style="background:#c5d2ea;"
| 1977-03-31|| Draw||align=left| Fakaew Surakorsang || Rajadamnern Stadium || Bangkok, Thailand || Decision || 5 || 3:00

|-  style="background:#cfc;"
| 1977-02-24 || Win ||align=left| Amnuaydej Devy || Lumpinee Stadium || Bangkok, Thailand || Decision || 5 ||3:00  

|-  style="background:#fbb;"
| 1977-01-27 || Loss ||align=left| Narongnoi Kiatbandit ||  || Bangkok, Thailand || Decision || 5 ||3:00

|-  style="background:#fbb;"
| 1976-12-07 || Loss ||align=left| Jitti Muangkhonkaen || Lumpinee Stadium || Bangkok, Thailand || Decision || 5 || 3:00

|-  style="background:#cfc;"
| 1976-11-11 || Win ||align=left| Nongkhai Sor.Prapatsorn || Rajadamnern Stadium|| Bangkok, Thailand || Decision || 5 || 3:00

|-  style="background:#cfc;"
| 1976-10-01 || Win ||align=left| Jocky Sitkanpai || Lumpinee Stadium || Bangkok, Thailand || Referee Stoppage|| 5 ||  

|-  style="background:#fbb;"
| 1976-05-04 || Loss ||align=left| Weerachat Sorndaeng || Lumpinee Stadium || Bangkok, Thailand || Decision || 5 || 3:00

|-  style="background:#fbb;"
| 1976-01-30 || Loss ||align=left| Jitti Muangkhonkaen || Huamark Stadium || Bangkok, Thailand || KO (High Kick)|| 2 || 

|-  style="background:#fbb;"
| 1975-11-12 || Loss||align=left| Jocky Sitkanpai || Rajadamnern Stadium || Bangkok, Thailand || Decision || 5 || 3:00

|-  style="background:#cfc;"
| 1975-10-08 || Win ||align=left| Jitti Muangkhonkaen || Lumpinee Stadium || Bangkok, Thailand || Decision || 5 || 3:00

|-  style="background:#fbb;"
| 1975- || Loss ||align=left| Bundit Singprakarn || Lumpinee Stadium || Bangkok, Thailand || Decision || 5 || 3:00

|-  style="background:#fbb;"
| 1975-06-30 || Loss ||align=left| Narongnoi Kiatbandit || Rajadamnern Stadium || Bangkok, Thailand || Decision || 5 ||3:00
|-
! style=background:white colspan=9 |

|-  style="background:#fbb;"
| 1975-05-02 || Loss ||align=left| Pudpadnoi Worawut || Lumpinee Stadium || Bangkok, Thailand || Decision || 5 || 3:00

|-  style="background:#cfc;"
| 1975-03-31 || Win ||align=left| Sirimongkol Luksiripat || Rajadamnern Stadium || Bangkok, Thailand || Decision || 5 || 3:00

|-  style="background:#cfc;"
| 1975-02-27 || Win ||align=left| Nongkhai Sor.Prapatsorn ||Rajadamnern Stadium || Bangkok, Thailand || Decision || 5 || 3:00

|-  style="background:#cfc;"
| 1975-01-06 || Win ||align=left| Khunponnoi Kiatsuriya ||Rajadamnern Stadium || Bangkok, Thailand || Decision || 5 || 3:00

|-  style="background:#cfc;"
| 1974-12- || Win ||align=left| Suksawat Srithewet|| Rajadamnern Stadium || Bangkok, Thailand || Decision || 5 ||3:00

|-  style="background:#cfc;"
| 1974-11- || Win ||align=left| Nongkhai Sor.Prapatsorn || Rajadamnern Stadium || Bangkok, Thailand || Decision || 5 ||3:00

|-  style="background:#cfc;"
| 1974- || Win ||align=left| Samersing Tianhiran ||Rajadamnern Stadium || Bangkok, Thailand || Decision || 5 ||3:00

|-  style="background:#cfc;"
| 1974-08-22|| Win ||align=left| Paruhat Longnoen || Rajadamnern Stadium || Bangkok, Thailand || Decision || 5||3:00 

|-  style="background:#fbb;"
| 1974-|| Loss ||align=left| Denthoraneenoi Ludtaksin || Rajadamnern Stadium || Bangkok, Thailand || Decision || 5||3:00 

|-  style="background:#fbb;"
| 1974-06-20|| Loss ||align=left| Denthoraneenoi Ludtaksin || Rajadamnern Stadium || Bangkok, Thailand || Decision || 5||3:00 
|-
! style=background:white colspan=9 |

|-  style="background:#cfc;"
| 1974-05-23|| Win ||align=left| Orachunnoi Hor Mahachai || Rajadamnern Stadium || Bangkok, Thailand || Decision || 5||3:00 

|-  style="background:#cfc;"
| 1974-04-30 || Win ||align=left| Naret Kiat Chor.Por. || || Tokyo, Japan || Decision || 5||3:00 
|-
! style=background:white colspan=9 |

|-  style="background:#cfc;"
| 1974-|| Win ||align=left| Sornphiphat Siharatdecho||  || Buriram, Thailand || Decision || 5||3:00 

|-  style="background:#cfc;"
| 1974-03-12 || Win ||align=left| Daonin Singasawin || Lumpinee Stadium || Bangkok, Thailand || Decision || 5||3:00 
|-
! style=background:white colspan=9 |

|-  style="background:#cfc;"
| 1974- || Win ||align=left| Saman Lukbanpho || Lumpinee Stadium || Bangkok, Thailand || KO || 4|| 

|-  style="background:#cfc;"
| 1974-01-22 || Win ||align=left| Ou Joon-hai || Kung Fu vs Muay Thai, Huamark Stadium || Bangkok, Thailand || KO (low kick) || 1 || 1:22

|-  style="background:#cfc;"
| 1972-09-29 || Win ||align=left| Samansak Poonsapcharoen || Huamark Stadium || Bangkok, Thailand || Decision || 5||3:00 
|-
| colspan=9 | Legend:

See more
List of Muay Thai practitioners

References

1956 births
Living people
Ruengsak Porntawee
Ruengsak Porntawee